KK Zenica Čelik (a.k.a. Omladinski košarkaški klub Čelik) is a Bosnian basketball team that competes in the Basketball Championship of Bosnia and Herzegovina. Formed in 1946, Zenica Čelik was champion of the Yugoslav second division (1. liga B) three times and played many years in the prestigious Yugoslav First Basketball League. At that time, first Yugoslav League was considered the best basketball league in Europe and the second best in the world, behind the NBA. In 1999, Zenica Čelik merged with Zenica Metalno.

Trophies and awards
Bosnian A1 League
Winners (3): 1994–95, 2005–06, 2008–09, 2013–14

Notable former players
 Teoman Alibegović
 Dževad Alihodžić
 Kenan Bajramović
 Adis Bećiragić
 Armin Bilić
 Miloš Cvijanović
 Muhamed Granić
 Feđa Jovanović
 Abdurahman Kahrimanović
 Ognjen Kuzmić
 Nebojša Maksimović
 Ivan Opačak
 Emir Preldžić
 Hasan Rizvić
 Zoran Savić

Notable former coaches
 Emir Mutapčić
 Mensur Bajramović
 Ljubomir Katić (1975–1979)
 Matan Rimac
 Zdenko Grgić
 Ivica Marić

References

External links
Official website

Basketball teams in Bosnia and Herzegovina
Basketball teams in Yugoslavia
Basketball teams established in 1946